Cynthia Ikponmwenosa Morgan (born 23 September 1991), popularly known by her previous stage name Cynthia Morgan, now Madrina, is a Nigerian born songwriter and singer. Her music is a fusion of pop, hip hop, dancehall and rap. She shot into limelight following the release of two singles titled "Don't Break My Heart" and "Lead Me On", which received massive airplay and positive reviews from critics. Cynthia made her acting debut in  2016 Nollywood movie "The Wrong Number" Directed by Saint Joseph ovensehi, and Ay's comedy movie A trip to Jamaica.

Early life and education
Cynthia Morgan was born in Benin City, Edo State where she completed her basic formal education. At the age of 3, she was already a backup singer for her mother's musical band.

Reports about Cynthia Morgan’s childhood say her father abandoned them when her mum was just 20-years-old and pregnant. She was then raised by a single mother who is now a top gospel artist in Benin City. That’s probably why Morgan fell in love with music at the early years of her life.

If Morgan truly started performing at age 3, it’s not surprising that she started making her own songs at the age of 7. Those experiences equipped her to lead her school choir in secondary school.

10 years later, Cynthia Morgan was set to record her first debut single. She featured Pype in the debut titled Dutty Stepping. Thereafter, she moved to Lagos to give her music career a push. She subsequently signed a recording deal with Northside Entertainment Inc.

With that deal, she proved her worth soonest. Her Don’t Break My Heart and Lead Me Onsingles received much attention which essentially, catapulted her to the limelight.

Going into music professionally at the age of 16 and releasing her first single at the age of 17, Cynthia Morgan showed she has a keen ability, enabling her to blend these genres of music together for something unique.

While “Don’t Break My Heart” flows with an upbeat Afro Pop synchronized to represent an ideal song suitable for wedding vow moments, “Lead Me On” exhibits a reggae-dancehall love song beautified with Morgan’s patois accent.

The singles continued to earn Cynthia heartwarming reviews and “Lead Me On” was eventually, nominated for “Best Reggae-Dancehall Single” at The Headies of 2014.

Career
At the age of 7, Cynthia Morgan started composing songs and at the age of 17 she recorded her debut single which featured General Pype "Dutty Stepping". In 2008, she moved to Lagos to further her music career. she calls herself "Killa Marshal" which is her Ego on stage.

On 22 August 2013, Cynthia Morgan signed a recording contract with Northside Entertainment Inc. owned by Jude 'Engees' Okoye. Few months later, she released two chart-topping singles "Don't Break My Heart" and "Lead Me On" which got positive reviews from fans; the latter went on to be nominated for "Best Reggae/Dancehall Single" at The Headies 2014

On 23 May 2020, Cynthia Morgan who has not released songs for years in an Instagram Live session revealed that she lost her stage name, “Cynthia Morgan”, her VEVO account, royalties, Instagram account and other things due to the contract she signed with Jude Okoye. She revealed that she became depressed after her fallout with Jude Okoye of Northside Entertainment but did not informed public about her issues. Fans went on to donate to a GoFundMe account set up for her  and even Afrobeats Superstar Davido weighed in and asked her to call him up for a collaboration.

Discography

Selected singles

"Dutty Stepping" (2009)
"Jhybo ft Cynthia Morgan-E jo lefero (2009)
"Right Move" (2011)
"High High High" & "Ojoro" (2012)
"Don't Break My Heart" & "Lead Me On" (2014)
"I'm Taken" (2014)
"Popori" (2014)
"German Juice" (2015)
"Come and Do" (2015)
"Simati Niya" (2015)
"Baby Mama (2015)
"Olowo" (2016)
"Bubble bup" (2016)
"In Love" (2017)
"No camera's" (2017)
"Summer Time" (2017)
"Hustle" (2020)

Madrina
"Billion Dollar Woman" (2018)
"Lion" (2018)

As featured artist

"Ejo le fe ro" – Jhybo ft. Cynthia Morgan (2010)
"Bruce Lee" – TK Tycoon ft. Cynthia Morgan & Tipsy (2011)
"Gbogbo Hustling" – Tha Suspect ft. Zee, Bigmaxx, Cynthia Morgan & Tesh Carter (2012)
"Faaji" – Tony Ross ft. Cynthia Morgan & A-Q (2013)
"Money" – KKTBM ft. Yung6ix, Cynthia Morgan, Tesh Carter & SD (2014)
Give Dem" – DJ Prince ft. Dammy Krane, Mac 2 & Cynthia Morgan (2014)
"Shoki [Female Version]" – Lil Kesh ft. Chidinma, Eva & Cynthia Morgan (2014)
"Jamo" – Illbliss ft. Cynthia Morgan (2014)
"Number 1" – Chopstix ft. Cynthia Morgan, Shaydee & Yung L (2015)
"Go Gaga (Remix)" – MC Galaxy ft. Stone Bwoy, Cynthia Morgan (2015)
"Telephone Lies" – Spydaman ft. Cynthia Morgan (2015)
"Come Over" – Splash ft Cynthia Morgan (2016)
"Twerk It" – Tony Ross ft. Cynthia Morgan, Phyno (2016)
"Fine n Clean" – Jesse Jagz ft. Cynthia Morgan (2017)
"Mosa" – Tony Ross ft Cynthia Morgan (2018)

Awards and nominations

See also

List of Nigerian musicians

References

Living people
1991 births
21st-century Nigerian women singers
Nigerian hip hop musicians
Musicians from Edo State
The Headies winners